The lorica plumata also known the lorica hamata squamatque was a set of Roman armor.  The name lorica plumata translates to feathered cuirass.  It was named for its a feathered appearance due to the feather-like scales called plumes attached to oval shaped rings. 

The lorica plumata was a sleeveless armor with no shoulder guards, that looked like a linothorax.  It was possibly reserved exclusively for the use of military leaders of the rank of tribune or above.  Typically only generals wore it, due to the high cost of production and maintenance.  The lorica plumata would have been an expensive piece of military equipment.  The lorica plumata was one of the few sets of armor that combined mail and scales.

History 
The lorica plumata was originally a Sarmatian armor. The earliest reference to the armor was made by the historian Marcus Junianus Justinus. He explains that the armor was used for soldiers, horses. and that it protects the entire body. From a set of armor found at Vize, Turkey, we know that the armor was in use during the first half of the first century and that it had remained in use up to the third century. At the Battle of Lake Trasimene the consul Flaminius's armor is described as "a coat of mail with, attached to it, wrought iron scales mingled with gold." The armor Flaminius is wearing is possibly the lorica plumata. It continued to be used up to the Marcomannic Wars.

Current sets of armor 
One fragment of this armor was allegedly found near Rome. It was obtained by a Duchess who would then give it to the Altes Museum in Berlin. Another incomplete set is found in the Roman Museum in Augsburg. The Istanbul Archaeological Museum has a complete set of the armor. The armor was found in Vize. Other pieces were found in Ouddorp, Usk, Xanten, Dülük Baba Tepesi, and Mandeure. Several other pieces have been found, although the location where they were found is unknown. Most of these sets were located in northern Europe near the borders of the Ancient Roman Empire. However, that could be a result of more archaeological research in those regions and the greater presence of Roman artefacts near the Limes Germanicus. A possible reason behind the lack of remnants of the lorica plumata is that identifying the armor is difficult.

Usage in the Roman army 
Many contest its utility on the field. Although, some theories suggest that it was exclusively a parade armor. This is because the armor is rather flimsy and small size of the individual components. Others counter this argument by stating that the Romans did not have a concept of parade armor, the locations of the remnants of the armor were in a similar context to armor which we know was suited for battle, and that we should not apply modern conceptions of the strength of a set of armor to the past.

Forging 
The 160 to 350,000 rings in the mail are arranged in alternating rows of oval-shaped riveted and solid rings made from either iron or a copper alloy. Riveted links are inserted into each hole, thus attaching the mail to the rings. In order to insert the rivet, they flattened the rings that overlapped with other rings with an awl. The rows of rings were overlapped left to right. Afterwards, the blacksmiths would perforate the lap using hammers and anvils. The holes were round at first, but during the forging process they were stretched by the force of the inserted rivets. This resulted in the rivet being clamped solidly into the ring.  The rivets were made by cutting copper strips to the required length. The rings were made by punching out sheet metal or by welding out wire. 

For every two rows of rings there was a horizontal row of loose scales. The armor was covered by 20 to 30,000 very small scales that were unlike any Roman scales. Each scale was folded to leave a 90° angle at the top. Four small holes can be found in the ledge formed by the angle. Some scales were superimposed downwards and arranged vertically. The scales had a rib down the center. These ribbed scales would have been metallic.  Scales were used in the design of the armor because they are lightweight, strong, tough, and flexible.  With overlapping scales, if parts of the armor are broken, the wearer is still protected. The result of this design would have been a heavy, highly flexible set of armor.  It was so flexible because its components were very small, allowing them to bend easily.

See also

Lorica segmentata
Lorica hamata
Lorica squamata
Manica (armguard)

References

Ancient Roman legionary equipment
Roman armour